Gymkhana is a British Raj term which originally referred to a place of assembly. The meaning then altered to denote a place where skill-based contests were held. "Gymkhana" is an Anglo-Indian expression, which is derived from the Persian word "Jamat-khana".  Most gymkhanas have a Gymkhana Club associated with them, a term coined during the British Raj for gentlemen's club.

More generally, gymkhana refers to a social and sporting club in the Indian subcontinent, and in other Asian countries including Malaysia, Thailand, Burma, and Singapore, as well as in East Africa.

Etymology

The first element of Gymkhana comes from gend meaning ball in Hindi/Hindustani/Khariboli. This element is distinct from the English word gym, short for gymnasium and  gymnastics which has  Greek and Latin roots. The second element, khānā has a Persian origin,  meaning a home or a compartment. In Persian, (خانه) is a term for dwelling, house.  The court language of the Mughal Empire was Persian.

See also

 List of India's gentlemen's clubs
 Hindu Gymkhana
 Bombay Gymkhana, Mumbai
 Deccan Gymkhana, Pune
 Delhi Gymkhana, Delhi
 HUDA Gymkhana Club, Sonipat
 Golaghat Gymkhana, Assam
 Chennai Gymkhana Club
 Madras Gymkhana Club, Chennai
 Gymkhana Ground, Rangoon, Myanmar
 Jamalpur Gymkhana, Bihar
 Jorhat Gymkhana Club, Assam
 Karachi Gymkhana Club, Pakistan
 Lahore Gymkhana Club, Pakistan
 Atmosphere Fitness, Karachi 
 Nairobi Gymkhana Club, Kenya
 Bahawal Gymkhana Bahawalpur, Pakistan
 Vehari Gymkhana, Pakistan
 Sahiwal Gymkhana, Pakistan

References

External links

Urdu-language words and phrases
Hindi words and phrases
Bengali words and phrases
Sports venues
Equestrian festivals